Abdolhossein Zarrinkoub  (Luri/Persian: , also Romanized as Zarrinkoob, Zarrinkub) (March 17, 1923 – September 15, 1999) was a scholar and professor of Iranian literature, history of literature, Persian culture and history.

He was born in Borujerd, Iran, received his PhD from Tehran University in 1955 under the supervision of Badiozzaman Forouzanfar, and held faculty positions at universities such as Oxford University, Sorbonne and Princeton University.

Research works 

Some of his works in English are:

 The Arab Conquest of Iran and its aftermath: in Cambridge History of Iran, Vol. 4, London, 1975.
 "Sufism in its historical perspective", Iranian studies III, 1970, p. 137-220
 Nizami, a Lifelong Quest for a Utopia, 1977, Rome.

Literary criticism and comparative literature 

Zarrinkoob wrote a book called "Naqd-e Adabi" ("Literary Criticism") covering comparative literature and Persian literary criticism.

Rumi and Erfan 

Zarrinkoub also wrote about the Persian poet Molana Jalaleddin Balkhi (Rumi) and his works. Zarrinkoub's "Serr-e Ney" ("Secret of the Reed"),  "Pelleh-Pelleh ta Molaqat-e Khuda" ("Step by Step until Visiting God") and "Bahr dar Koozeh" ("Sea in a Jug") are critiques and comparative analyses of Rumi's Masnavi. 

Zarrinkoub's research works on Hafez and Persian mysticism resulted in several books including "Az Kuche-ye Rendan" and "Arzesh-e Miras-e Sufiyeh".

History of Persia 

Zarrinkoub wrote "Two Centuries of Silence" on Islamic history and  Ruzegaran (The Ages) (Iran's history from the beginning to the fall of the Pahlavi dynasty), which covers the 3,000-year history of Iran since the Aryans migrated to the Iranian plateau.

See also 

 Persian literature
 Iranology
 Intellectual Movements in Iran

References

External links 
 Iranian Researcher -  Abdolhossein Zarrinkoub
 ʻAbd al-Ḥusayn Zarrīnʹkūb (1379 (2000)). Dū qarn sukūt: sarguz̲asht-i ḥavādis̲ va awz̤āʻ-i tārīkhī dar dū qarn-i avval-i Islām (Two Centuries of Silence). Tihrān: Sukhan. , .

Iranian literary scholars
Iranian literary critics
20th-century Iranian historians
People from Borujerd
University of Tehran alumni
Academic staff of the University of Tehran
Academic staff of the University of Paris
Princeton University faculty
1923 births
1999 deaths
Burials at artist's block of Behesht-e Zahra
Researchers of Persian literature
Faculty of Letters and Humanities of the University of Tehran alumni
Abdolhossein Zarrinkoob